Albert John Reiss Jr. (December 9, 1922 – April 27, 2006) was an American sociologist and criminologist.

Career 
He served as the William Graham Sumner Professor of Sociology at Yale University from 1970 until his retirement in 1993. He is recognized for his contributions to social control theory, as well as for his research on police violence. He has been credited with coining the term "proactive" while researching violent incidents between police and private citizens as a research director for Lyndon B. Johnson's President's Commission on Law Enforcement and Administration of Justice. This research led Reiss to conclude that there was a greater risk of violence in proactive police encounters than in reactive ones, prompting innovation in policing practices in many American police departments.

Reiss served as president of the Society for the Study of Social Problems in 1968–69. In 1983, he was elected to the American Academy of Arts and Sciences. He was also a Fellow of the American Statistical Association. He was elected president of the American Society of Criminology in 1984, and of the International Society of Criminology in 1990, making him the first person to serve as president of both organizations. In 1996, the American Sociological Association named its Award for Distinguished Scholarship in Crime, Law and Deviance after him.

References

1922 births
2006 deaths
American criminologists
People from Sheboygan County, Wisconsin
Marquette University alumni
University of Chicago alumni
Fellows of the American Academy of Arts and Sciences
Fellows of the American Statistical Association
Presidents of the American Society of Criminology
University of Iowa faculty
University of Michigan faculty
University of Wisconsin–Madison faculty
Vanderbilt University faculty
Yale University faculty